LEO Pharma A/S is a multinational Danish pharmaceutical company, founded in 1908, with a presence in about 100 countries. Its headquarters are in Ballerup, near Copenhagen The company is 100% integrated into a private foundation owned by the LEO Foundation. LEO Pharma develops and markets products for dermatology, bone remodeling thrombosis and coagulation. In 1945, it was the first producer of penicillin outside the US and UK.

History

Formation & the 20th Century
In 1908, pharmacists August Kongsted and Anton Antons bought the LEO Pharmacy in Copenhagen, Denmark. With the purchase, they established 'Københavns Løveapoteks kemiske Fabrik', today known as LEO Pharma. LEO Pharma celebrated its centennial in 2008. Flags bearing the LEO logo were flying in every country where LEO products are available, more than a hundred flags in total. Today, LEO Pharma has an ever growing pipeline with over 4,800 specialists focusing on dermatology and thrombosis.
1912 – The company launched its own Aspirin headache tablet
1917 – The company exported Denmark's first drug, Digisolvin
1940 – The company launched its own heparin product.
1958 – Patent filed for bendrofluazide.
1962 – The company launched Fucidin to be used to treat staphylococcus infections.

21st Century & onwards
In 2015, the company announced it would acquire Astellas Pharmas dermatology business for $725 million.

In 2018, the company acquired Bayer's dermatology unit for an undisclosed amount.

In January 2023, the company started extensive layoffs (of about 300 of its current employees, or ~5% of the workforce) as a part of major restructuring and reorganization in anticipation of a possibly planned IPO. Because of slimming down of the company's R&D program, new early-stage drug candidates will have to be sourced externally.

References

Pharmaceutical companies of Denmark
Companies based in Ballerup Municipality
Pharmaceutical companies established in 1908
Danish companies established in 1908